Cactus finch may refer to the following birds:
Common cactus finch, Geospiza scandens, small cactus finch.
Española cactus finch, Geospiza conirostris.
Genovesa cactus finch, Geospiza propinqua.